Rohrer & Brammer was a theatre in Munich, Bavaria, Germany. It was closed in May 2010.

Theatres in Munich